USA Next (also known as USA United Generations), formerly known as the United Seniors Association, is a United States lobbyist group whose slogan is "Building a Legacy of Freedom for America's Families". It presents itself as a conservative senior citizens organization. The group is a 501(c)(4) organization. Since 2001, Charles Jarvis has led the group.

According to the group's website, "USA United Generations and USA NEXT are grassroots projects of United Seniors Association (USA) which is celebrating its 13th anniversary as the non-partisan, 1.5 million-plus nationwide grassroots network Uniting the Generations for America’s Future." 

United Seniors Association took in $26.6 million in revenue for 2003 according to the group's IRS form 990.

USA Next presents itself as an interest group for senior citizens as an alternative to the American Association of Retired Persons (AARP).

Criticisms 
As a self-described conservative alternative to the AARP, USA Next has often received criticism for its political orientation and associations; in particular, to its connections to conservative positions, organizations, and businesses. It also receives criticism for certain organizational issues.

In February 2003, the rival organization AARP stated that "recently, the U.S. Social Security Administration ordered one of them to halt what it determined to be misleading mailings." USANext was eventually fined $554,000 for two such mailings, violating a 1988 amendment to the Social Security Act in 1988 prohibiting the private use of the phrase "Social Security" and several related terms in any way that would convey a false impression of approval from the Social Security Administration. The constitutionality of this law (42 U.S.C. § 1140) was upheld in United Seniors Association, Inc. v. Social Security Administration, ___ F.3d ___ (4th Cir. 2005) (text at Findlaw). On May 30, 2006, the Supreme Court declined to hear an appeal.

It also reports that it began backing a plan "to allow more production of domestic energy in Alaska's Arctic National Wildlife Refuge" after receiving more than $181,000 from Anchorage-based Arctic Power.

The liberal  think-tank Center for American Progress stated in its report of November 14, 2003: :COMPANIES HIRE MERCENARY "GRASSROOTS" GROUP: To influence the final Medicare bill, the drug industry has bankrolled a front group to air ads throughout the country. The  United Seniors Association (USA) is "a conservative, grassroots organization for the elderly just as likely to be flacking for corporate special interests as it is to be representing seniors." The drug lobby pays the group "as a front for its TV and radio 'issue' ad campaigns," which is also "used by several corporate energy front groups pushing for the GOP [ Republican Party ] legislation."

A May 2004 article from the center-Left The Washington Monthly elaborated as follows:

Then there's the benignly-named United Seniors Association (USA), which serves as a soft money slush fund for a single GOP-friendly industry: pharmaceuticals. USA claims a nationwide network of more than one million activists, but, just like Progress for America, listed zero income from membership dues in its most recent available tax return. USA does, however, have plenty of money on its hands. During the 2002 elections, with an "unrestricted educational grant" from the drug industry burning a hole in its pocket, the group spent roughly $14 million--the lion's share of its budget--on ads defending Republican members of Congress for their votes on a Medicare prescription-drug bill.

In 2004, USANext was one of the groups supporting the Bush administration's Social Security privatization plan. According to the New York Times, the organization had $28 million in annual revenues, and it aggressively seeks contributions from industry: "Health care companies, energy companies, the food industry, just about everybody except for financial investment companies."

The Times reported in February 2005 the group's recent hires:

To help set USA Next's strategy, the group has hired Chris LaCivita, a Republican consultant who advised Swift Vets and POWs for Truth, formerly known as Swift Boat Veterans for Truth, on its media campaign and helped write its commercials. He earned more than $30,000 for his work, campaign finance filings show.

Officials said the group is also seeking to hire Rick Reed, a partner at Stevens Reed Curcio & Potholm, a firm that was hired by Swift Vets and was paid more than $276,000 to do media production, records show.

For public relations, USA Next has turned to Creative Response Concepts, a Virginia firm that represented both Swift Vets—the company was paid more than $165,000—and Regnery Publishing, the publisher of "Unfit for Command," a book about Senator John Kerry's military service whose co-author was John E. O'Neill, one of the primary leaders of Swift Vets.

In March 2004, the United Seniors Association commissioned a push-poll about the potential rise in long-distance telephone costs as a result of a prior DC Circuit Court ruling.

In a letter to Congress on March 10, 2004, Mary P. Mahoney, Vice President of Government Relations for USA, wrote: "We are concerned about the recent development in the DC Circuit Court that over turned what Congress has done in regard to local telephone competition. We know you must be as concerned about this as we are... I have enclosed an op-ed by [USA President] Charlie Jarvis, an op-ed by Tech Central Station's James Glassman, as well as a script of a telephone survey we will be conducting in your district."

This action appears to be coordinated with a campaign run by Voices for Choices to pressure the Bush administration and Federal Communications Commission to appeal a telecommunications court decision. In addition to being president of USA, Charlie Jarvis is a board member of Defenders of Property Rights, one of several conservative groups that comprise the AT&T-funded (and DCI Group-operated) "Voices for Choices" coalition front group. The Washington Monthly also exposed Tech Central Station in December 2003 as a DCI creation with funding from AT&T. According to news reports, AT&T opposed the DC Circuit ruling because the decision would impact the company's bottom line.

In February 2005, USA Next hired the advertising agency behind the Swift Boat Veterans for Truth campaign that attacked 2004 presidential candidate John F. Kerry. The group gained instant notoriety late in that month when they placed an advertisement on several conservative web sites and blogs. This advertisement depicted a large red 'x' over a picture of a soldier and a large green check mark over a picture of a just-married homosexual couple. The AARP has no position on marriage rights for homosexuals, but (along with many established groups including the AFL-CIO) opposed an amendment to Ohio's state constitution intended to prohibit gay marriage, claiming it would deprive all unmarried cohabitating couples of rights they currently enjoyed. The amendment was passed in November 2004 by Ohio voters.

In March 2005, the couple Richard and Steven Hansen-Raymen pictured in the advertisement filed a US$25 million lawsuit against USA Next, alleging that group used the couple's image without their permission. A restraining order preventing USA Next from running the ad was granted.

While the organization, however, has no age requirement for membership it does openly claim an agenda for reforming or retrenching of the American Social Security entitlement program and strengthening American institutions so they will be able to benefit current and future generations.

An "opinion poll" on the USA Next web site asked the question, "Did you know that the AARP has taken over $1 billion in taxpayer money over the last 20 years?"

The organization has also received criticism from conservatives and libertarians for signing on to a lawsuit against the tobacco industry. Theodore Frank of the American Enterprise Institute called the lawsuit "frivolous" and Walter Olson of the Manhattan Institute for Policy Research and Cato Institute criticized the move as placing them in company with Eliot Spitzer for litigiousness.

Supportive views 
There are seniors who feel that the AARP has a socially liberal outlook, which is not relevant to their needs as elders and may actively go against their values. Seniors who feel this way find conservative groups like USA Next to be more compatible to themselves. This more socially conservative outlook is buttressed by Charles Jarvis's connections to Focus on the Family.

Staff and board members 
Information from Public Citizen and from USA's IRA form 990.
 USA President and CEO Charles Jarvis served as deputy under secretary at the Department of Interior during the Reagan and Bush administrations. Jarvis was also the executive vice president of Focus on the Family. Jarvis received $242,500 in base salary for his work in 2003.
 Craig Shirley, a USA board member, has long been a Republican Party public relations powerhouse. His public relations firm Shirley & Banister Public Affairs currently represents the Republican National Committee (RNC). During the 1984 presidential campaign, he was the director of communications for the National Conservative Political Action Committee, America's largest independent political committee. More recently, he co-founded Conservatives for Effective Leadership, an organization devoted to defeating Hillary Clinton in her Senate bid.
 The New York Times called USA board member Jack Abramoff "one of the most influential—and, at $500 an hour, best compensated—lobbyists in Washington."
 USA board member James Wootton is president of the U.S. Chamber of Commerce Institute for Legal Reform where he advocates for tort "reform."  During the 2000 election cycle, PhRMA shoveled $10 million to the Chamber of Commerce to run electioneering ads just before the November election.
 USA lobbyist David Keene is chairman of the American Conservative Union, the nation's largest conservative grassroots organization. Keene is a lobbyist with the Carmen Group.
 Beau Boulter, a USA lobbyist, is a former GOP congressman from Texas who served in the House of Representatives from 1985 to 1989. He formerly lobbied for the Carmen Group and represented the Major Medicaid Hospital Coalition, Northwest Airlines and U.S. Bank.
 Lawyer Curtis Hergé, USA's corporate counsel, served as a member of Reagan's Presidential Transition Team. He later held positions as the assistant to the secretary and chief of staff at the Department of the Interior.
 William Brindley is executive vice president/treasurer for USA. He received $126,000 for his work in 2003.
 Entertainer Art Linkletter served as the group national chair and spokesman.
 Other USA directors and paid staff:
 Sandra Bulter, director
 Anne R. Keast, director
 Ron Robinson, director
 A. Lee Barrett, Jr., director
 Anne L. Edwards, director
 Kathy Diamond, VP member services
 Mary P. Mahoney, VP legislative
 Kathleen Pattern, VP marketing

References 

 Bischoff, Laura A. (October 2, 2004). "Opposition grows to gay-wed ban; AARP, OSU League oppose amendment proposal." Dayton Daily News, pg. B1
 Justice, Glen (February 20, 2005). "A new battle For advisers To Swift Vets." New York Times, pg. A1.
 Justice, Glen and David D. Kirkpatrick (February 22, 2005). "Group makes pre-emptive strike against AARP on benefits plan." New York Times, pg. A16.
 Sarasohn, David (March 13, 2005). "A wedding photo shot from the right." The Oregonian, pg. E04.
 Barbara T. Dreyfuss, "Poison Pill: How Abramoff's cronies sold the Medicare drug bill", Washington Monthly, November 2006

External links 
 USA Next

Supportive articles 
 Banner Ads: "The Real AARP Agenda," The American Spectator, February 21, 2005: here and here."

Critical articles 
 "United Seniors Association: Hired Guns for PhRMA and Other Corporate Interests," Public Citizen, July 2002.
 "United Seniors Association: Hired Guns for PhRMA and Other Corporate Interests" Update, Public Citizen, October 2002.
 Bill Hogan,  "Pulling Strings from Afar. Drug Industry Finances Nonprofit Groups That Claim to Speak for Older Americans," AARP Bulletin, February 2003.
 Nicholas Confessore, "Meet the Press: How James Glassman reinvented journalism--as lobbying", Washington Monthly, December 2003.
 Nicholas Confessore, "Bush's Secret Stash. Why the GOP war chest is even bigger than you think," Washington Monthly, May 2004.
 Edmund L. Andrews, "Clamor Grows in the Privatization Debate," New York Times, December 17, 2004.
 Glen Justice, "A New Target for Advisers to Swift Vets," New York Times, February 21, 2005.
 Joshua Marshall, "Oh, imagine that," Talking Points Memo, February 22, 2005: "USANext has pulled its AARP hates the troops and loves gay marriage ad. Well, needless to say we got plenty o' copies -- not just the ad but the ad as seen on the American Spectator website."
 Bill Berkowitz, "Richard Viguerie's Army Attacks Social Security", MediaTransparency.org, March 9, 2005.

Political advocacy groups in the United States
501(c)(4) nonprofit organizations
Seniors' organizations
Conservative organizations in the United States